Comparative biology uses natural variation and disparity to understand the patterns of life at all levels—from genes to communities—and the critical role of organisms in ecosystems.  Comparative biology is a cross-lineage approach to understanding the phylogenetic history of individuals or higher taxa and the mechanisms and patterns that drives it. Comparative biology encompasses Evolutionary Biology, Systematics, Neontology, Paleontology, Ethology, Anthropology, and Biogeography as well as historical approaches to Developmental biology, Genomics, Physiology, Ecology and many other areas of the biological sciences. The comparative approach also has numerous applications in human health, genetics, biomedicine, and conservation biology. The biological relationships (phylogenies, pedigree) are important for comparative analyses and usually represented by a phylogenetic tree or cladogram to differentiate those features with single origins (Homology) from those with multiple origins (Homoplasy).

See also
Cladistics
Comparative Anatomy
Evolution
Evolutionary Biology
Systematics
Bioinformatics
Neontology
Paleontology
Phylogenetics
Genomics

Evolutionary biology
Comparisons